Into the Darkness may refer to:

 "Into the Darkness" (song), a song by the band Kittie
 Into the Darkness (novel), the first book in Harry Turtledove's Darkness series
 Urban Explorers: Into the Darkness, a 2007 documentary film about urban exploration
 Star Trek Into Darkness, a 2013 film in the Star Trek franchise